Śuri, latinised as Soranus, was an Etruscan, Faliscan, Capenate and Sabine god adopted into ancient Roman religion. He was worshipped on Mt. Soracte in Lazio. The area was sacred to underworld gods, such as Dis Pater.

The worshippers of Apollo Soranus, after his cult had been subsumed by Apollo, were called Hirpi Sorani ("wolves of Soranus", from Sabine hirpus "wolf"). They were firewalkers and carried about the entrails of sacrifices during ceremonies.

Soranus was identified with Dīs Pater, a Roman god of the soil, earth and underworld, or with Apollo, a Greek god adopted by the Romans, and had a female partner, Catha or Feronia, whose sanctuary was located next to his.

Name 
In the Etruscan language, Śur means black, while Śuri is thought to mean "from the black [place]" (the Underworld). Various scholars have proposed a link to the Norse demon Surtr, whose name also means black.

References

External links
Myth Index - Soranus
Mika Rissanen:  The Hirpi Sorani and the Wolf Cults of Central Italy 

Roman gods
Etruscan gods